Schlossfelsen is a mountain of Baden-Württemberg, Germany. It is located in Albstadt, Zollernalbkreis.

Mountains and hills of Baden-Württemberg
Albstadt